is a Japanese footballer who last played for Tokyo United.

Career statistics

Club
.

Notes

References

1992 births
Living people
Japanese footballers
Japanese expatriate footballers
Association football defenders
Tokyo Gakugei University alumni
Slovenian PrvaLiga players
NK Celje players
Tokyo United FC players
Expatriate footballers in Slovenia